James Calder (February 16, 1826 – November 22, 1893) was the third president of Hillsdale College, serving from 1869 to 1871, and the fifth president of the Pennsylvania State University, serving from 1871 until 1880.

References

 Penn State Presidents and their achievements
 

1826 births
1893 deaths
Presidents of Pennsylvania State University